The Spanish stage of the UEFA Region's Cup is a biennial Spanish football tournament for amateur teams which represent the Spanish Autonomous Communities. Its winner qualifies for the next UEFA Regions' Cup, played the following year.

History
The tournament was created in 1999, after the 1999 UEFA Regions' Cup where there was no qualifying tournament and Madrid represented Spain in the international contest (they eventually finished as runners-up).

It is contested by all 19 autonomous cities and communities, with Navarre the last territory to participate in 2005. Only amateur players between 18 and 35 years old, who never signed a professional contract, are eligible for this tournament.

Finals

Notes

Finalists

* hosts

Performance by team

Performance in the UEFA Regions' Cup

See also
UEFA Regions' Cup
List of UEFA Regions' Cup qualifying competitions

References

External links
Royal Spanish Football Federation website

 
UEFA Regions' Cup
Football cup competitions in Spain